"A House Divided" is a song by Australian singer songwriter Rick Price.  It was released as the fourth single from his debut studio album  Heaven Knows in February 1993. The song peaked at No. 74 in Australia.

Track listing
CD single 
 "House Divided"
 "Where Are You Now?"
 "If You Were My Baby"

Charts

References

Rick Price songs
Songs written by Rick Price
1992 songs
1993 singles
Columbia Records singles
Songs written by Pam Reswick